Ajuga decumbens is a herbaceous flowering plant native to China, Japan and Korea. It is commonly found in lightly forested sunny areas, such as meadows and roadsides between 400 and 2300 metres in altitude. It flowers between April and June.

Description
The entire plant is analgesic, decoagulant, depurative, febrifuge and haemostatic, and is used internally to relieve bladder ailments, whilst it is used externally to treat burns and cuts.

References

External links

decumbens
Flora of Asia
Flora of Japan
Flora of Korea
Garden plants of Asia
Groundcovers